This is a list of historical reenactment events.

Comparison of events

Germany 
Zeitreise Fulda

Italy 
Federicus

Netherlands
Battle of Grolle

Poland
 Battle of Grunwald reenactment

Russian Federation 
 Battle of Borodino (Borodino Museum, Mozhaysky district, Moscow oblast)
 Bylinniy bereg (Kimry, Tver oblast).
 Defense of Moscow (Borodino Museum, Mozhaysky district, Moscow oblast)
 Doushonovo Festival (Doushonovo Manoeuvres)

South Africa
Battle of Blood River
Battle of Isandlwana
Battle of Majuba Hill

Spain
Battle of Almansa reenactment

United Kingdom
 Eglinton Tournament of 1839
 Largs Viking Festival Battle of Largs
 War and Peace Revival
 Whitehall Parade, London, commemorating the execution of King Charles I (The King's Army) 28 January 2007

United States

Military
 Battle of Averasborough, North Carolina
 Battle of Bentonville, North Carolina
 Battle of Chancellorsville, Virginia
 Battle of Gettysburg, Pennsylvania
 Battle of the Little Bighorn, Montana
 Battle of Olustee, Florida
 Battle of Waynesboro, Virginia
 Big Cypress Shootout, Florida
 Boston Massacre, reenactment in Oak Glen, California 
 Camp Harding, Pennsylvania
 D-Day Conneaut, Ohio
Numerous events at Fort Ticonderoga, New York
Assault on Fort Ontario "Something Wicked This Way Comes"   Oswego, NY

Renaissance fairs
 Alabama Renaissance Faire, Alabama
 Arizona Renaissance Festival, Arizona
 Bristol Renaissance Faire, Wisconsin
 Carolina Renaissance Festival, North Carolina
 Georgia Renaissance Festival, Georgia
 Kansas City Renaissance Festival, Kansas
 Kentucky Highland Renaissance Festival, Kentucky
 King Richard's Faire, Massachusetts
Koroneburg Renaissance Festival, California
 Louisiana Renaissance Festival, Louisiana
 Maryland Renaissance Festival, Maryland
 Michigan Renaissance Festival, Michigan
 Middlefaire, Texas
 Minnesota Renaissance Festival, Minnesota
 New York Renaissance Faire, New York
 Ohio Renaissance Festival, Ohio
 Pennsylvania Renaissance Faire, Pennsylvania
 Pittsburgh Renaissance Festival, Pennsylvania
 Renaissance Pleasure Faire of Southern California, California
 Scarborough Renaissance Festival, Texas
 Sterling Renaissance Festival, New York
 Texas Renaissance Festival, Texas
 Virginia Renaissance Faire, Virginia
 Wicked Winter Renaissance Faire, New Jersey

Rendezvous 

 Spirit of Vincennes Rendezvous, Indiana
 Feast of the Hunter's Moon   West Lafayette, Indiana
Bridgeton Mountain Man Rendezvous   Bridgeton, Indiana
Southwestern Regional Rendezvous, Arkansas
Rocky Mountain National Rendezvous, location changes year to year (past events held in MT, CO, WY)
Colonial Faire (http://www.rileysfarm.com/faire) Oak Glen, California
Gathering at Garst   Greenville, Ohio
Feast of the Strawberry Moon   Grand Rapids, Michigan
Gathering at the Crossing  Cayuga, Indiana
Woolaroc 1840’S Mountain Man Camp   Bartlesville, Oklahoma
Paiute Mountain Rendezvous, California
Joliet Muzzleloaders Spring Rendezvous, Illinois

Colonial/Frontier Fairs and Markets 

 Colonial Market Days   Lebanon, Indiana
 Fair at New Boston, Ohio
 Colonial Market & Fair   Mount Vernon, Virginia
 Kalamazoo Living History Show Kalamazoo, Michigan
 The 18th Century Colonial Trade Fair at Wolf Creek  Loudonville, Ohio

Other
 1940's World War II Era Ball, Colorado
 Victorian Day in Historic Grand Ledge, Michigan
The Palace Garden Party    Colonial Williamsburg, Virginia
Living History Weekend, Fort Ligonier, Pennsylvania
Revolutionary War Living History Weekend, Pennsylvania
Numerous events at Fort Ticonderoga, New York
Revolutionary War Weekend, Mount Vernon, Virginia
History Alive at Fort Piqua, Ohio
River Through Time  Coldwater, Michigan
Stone's Trace Historical Society Pioneer Festival  Ligonier, Indiana
River of Time  Bay City, Michigan
Apple Festival of Kendallville   Kendallville, Indiana
Johnny Appleseed Festival   Fort Wayne, Indiana
Fort Harrod Settlement & Raid    Harrodsburg, Kentucky

Footnotes

See also 
 Historical reenactment
 List of historical reenactment groups

 
Lists of events